Muldenhammer is a municipality in the Vogtlandkreis district, in Saxony, Germany. It was formed by the merger of the previously independent municipalities Hammerbrücke, Morgenröthe-Rautenkranz and Tannenbergsthal, on 1 October 2009. It consists of the Ortsteile (divisions) Gottesberg, Hammerbrücke, Jägersgrün, Morgenröthe-Rautenkranz, Schneckenstein and Tannenbergsthal.

Personalities
Sigmund Jähn (b. 1937), first German cosmonaut, born in Morgenröthe-Rautenkranz.

References

Vogtlandkreis